In the sense of revenge retaliation is a harmful action against a person or group in response to a grievance.

Retaliation or Retaliate may also refer to:
 workplace or employment retaliation in the context of employment discrimination
 Retaliate (Angerfist album), 2011
 Retaliate (Misery Index album), 2003
 Retaliation (film), a 1968 Japanese film
 Retaliation (Carnivore album), 1987
 Retaliation (Dane Cook album), a 2005 comedy album/DVD
 Retaliation (Keak da Sneak album), 2002
 "Retaliation" (song), a song by Jedi Mind Tricks
Retaliator, a 2012 Nerf blaster released under the N-Strike Elite series
 Retaliation (German band), German death metal band, formed in 2005

See also 
 Avenger (disambiguation)
 Eye for an eye, in the Hebrew Bible
 Reprisal, in warfare, a permissible act of retaliation
 Reprisal (novel), a novel in The Adversary Cycle by F. Paul Wilson
 Retorsion, in international law, an act of retaliation by one nation upon another
 Retribution (disambiguation)
 Revenge (disambiguation)
 Vengeance (disambiguation)